2007–08 Eerste Klasse was a Dutch association football season of the Eerste Klasse.

Saturday champions were:
 A: RKAV Volendam
 B: SVV Scheveningen
 C: VV Heerjansdam
 D: SDC Putten
 E: Harkemase Boys

Sunday champions were:
 A: FC Hilversum
 B: HBS Craeyenhout
 C: TSV Longa
 D: SV Venray
 E: VV Germania
 F: SC Joure

Eerste Klasse seasons
4